al-Hazmi is an Arabic family name.

People
 Nawaf al-Hazmi (1976–2001), Saudi hijacker of American Airlines Flight 77
 Salem al-Hazmi (1981–2001), Saudi hijacker of American Airlines Flight 77

Arabic-language surnames